Kondor (also Romanized as Kundar) is a village in Khomeh Rural District, in the Central District of Aligudarz County, Lorestan Province, Iran. At the 2006 census, its population was 438, in 83 families.

Notes 

Towns and villages in Aligudarz County